Sultan Ghalib II bin Awadh al-Qu'aiti al-Hadhrami (born 7 January 1948) is the former sultan of the Qu'aiti State or Qu'aiti Sultanate, in modern Yemen, and the current head of the Al-Qu'aiti household. The once ruling Qu’aiti dynasty of Hadramaut was Yafa’i in origin. He reigned from 11 October 1966 until the monarchy was ousted by communists on 17 September 1967.

Sultan Ghalib was born in London, United Kingdom, and is the eldest son of his predecessor, Sultan Awadh bin Saleh. His coronation took place 10 June 1967. After his forced abdication, Ghalib married Sultana Rashid Ahmed on 7 June 1975, with whom he has fathered one son, Prince Saleh and two daughters, Princess Fatima and Princess Muzna.

Sultan Ghalib holds an MA from the University of Oxford in Oriental Studies (Islamic History) and another in Arabian Studies from the University of Cambridge, both with honours. The Sultan graduated from Millfield School. He has been a Saudi resident since 1968, currently residing in Jeddah. He has working knowledge of seven languages including Arabic, English, French, German, Persian, Turkish and Urdu/Hindi, which supports his research of various historical periods and geographic regions.

During his later years, he has authored a number of papers and books on Islam and Arab history, including The Holy Cities, the Pilgrimage and the World of Islam (2008).

Ancestry

References

External links
 Official Website of the Al-Quaiti Royal Family of Hadhramaut

1948 births
Living people
Middle Eastern royalty
20th-century Yemeni people
People educated at Millfield